Karthik Saragur (Kannada: ಕಾರ್ತಿಕ್ ಸರಗೂರ್) is an Indian film director, screenwriter and lyricist who works primarily in Kannada cinema.

Early life
Karthik hails from Saragur, a small town in Mysore district of Karnataka. He studied in Sri Ramakrishna Vidyashala, a residential school in Mysore, where he received the Gold medal for the best outgoing student.

Career
Karthik Saragur began his career by making docudramas like Vivekananda by Vivekananda. He received critical acclaim for "Bengaluru: idu namma ooru", a hugely popular 90 part documentary series about the history of Bangalore and its various neighbourhoods presented by Suresh Moona. In 2007, his work for Nagesh Kukunoor's Bollywood film Dor earned a Best Costume Design award nomination at the 52nd Filmfare Awards.

Saragur's debut directorial Jeerjimbe elicited rave reviews on its release. The Indian Express hailed Jeerjimbe as one “those films which makes us believe in our dreams. And it does so effortlessly, given the complexities of human emotions during such a journey”. Times of India likened Saragur's work “to the cinema one experiences from Iran or Italy, where the narrative is subtle and realistic". This film won four Karnataka State Film Awards, the most for any film in 2016. Film Companion included Jeerjimbe in one of Kannada cinema's five hidden gems from 2018.

Saragur's latest release is Bheema Sena Nala Maharaja. It was released online as part of Amazon Primevideo's Great Indian Festival. The film is produced by Pushkara Mallikarjunaiah, Rakshit Shetty, and Hemanth M. Rao. This is the second collaboration of Karthik Saragur and Pushkara Mallikarjunaiah after Jeerjimbe.

Filmography

Awards and nominations

References

External links
 

Living people
Kannada film directors
Kannada screenwriters
Film directors from Bangalore
Screenwriters from Bangalore
Year of birth missing (living people)